Straight Dave may refer to:
Straight Dave, a character in Closer to Heaven
Straight Dave, an alias used by the character Brüno in the film Brüno